Toombul railway station is located on the North Coast line in Queensland, Australia. It is one of two stations serving the Brisbane suburb of Nundah, the other being Nundah station. On 29 November 1999, two extra platforms opened as part of the quadruplication of the line from Bowens Hills to Northgate.

Services
Toombul station is served daily by all stops City network services from Shorncliffe to Central, many continuing to Park Road, Cannon Hill, Manly and Cleveland Also see Inner City timetable

Services by Platform

Transport links
Toombul station is served by Brisbane Transport buses calling at the nearby Toombul bus interchange.

References

External links

Toombul station Queensland Rail
[ Toombul station] Queensland's Railways on the Internet

Nundah, Queensland
Railway stations in Brisbane
Toombul, Queensland
North Coast railway line, Queensland